Easebourne is a village, Anglican parish and civil parish in the Chichester District of West Sussex, England. It is half a mile (0.8 km) north of Midhurst, across the River Rother on the A272 and A286 roads. The parish includes the hamlet of Henley to the north. In the 2001 census there were 708 households with a total population of 1,717 of whom 785 were economically active.

History
Easebourne (Eseburne) was listed in the Domesday Book of 1086 as an ancient Hundred, an extensive area reaching as far afield as Graffham and Cocking to the south, Stedham to the west and Tillington to the east, as well as two hamlets that were not parishes: Todham to the southeast and Buddington to the west; in total it included 12 settlements containing 276 households.

In 1861, the population was 859, and the area of the parish .

Governance
An electoral ward of the same name exists. This ward includes Lodsworth and at the 2011 census had a population of 2,492.

Amenities
There is one public house in Easebourne, the White Horse, and one in Henley, the Duke Of Cumberland. The Rother Inn closed in 1994 and the Holly Tree in 2004. Cowdray Park, to the east of the village, has a golf course, and is home to a first-class polo club.

Parish
The parish church of St Mary is 13th century or earlier. The parish includes the hamlet of Henley to the north, where there was a Mission Hall established in 1885, since closed. In the 2001 census there were 708 households with a total population of 1,717 of whom 785 were economically active.

Notable buildings
Adjacent to the polo grounds lie the ruins of the Tudor Cowdray House, built as a Tudor mansion with castle features. Started in 1520, it was completed by 1542, but was devastated by fire in 1793. It has not been occupied since.

Easebourne Priory was built for ten Augustinian canonesses and was founded before 1238 by the de Bohun family who were from St. Ann's Hill in nearby Midhurst.

On the northern edge of Easebourne village on the A286 road Budgenor Lodge, recently converted into luxury flats, is the former Midhurst Union Workhouse which was opened in  1794 by a Gilbert Union of seventeen parishes. From 1835 it was run and enlarged by the Midhurst Poor Law Union, serving 26 parishes.

Notable people
Anti-apartheid activist Helen Joseph was born in the village in 1905. Rear-Admiral Francis Buller lived in Easebourne in retirement. Actors Laurence Fox and Billie Piper were married in St Mary's Church in 2007.

References

External links

Further historical information and sources on GENUKI

Villages in West Sussex
Chichester District